Chiara Rebagliati (born 23 January 1997) is an Italian archer. She won the gold medal in the women's recurve event at the 2022 World Games held in Birmingham, Alabama, United States. She competed in the women's individual, women's team and mixed team events at the 2020 Summer Olympics held in Tokyo, Japan. She studied at University of Insubria.

She won the silver medal in the women's team event at the 2022 Mediterranean Games held in Oran, Algeria. She also competed in the women's individual event.

References

External links
 

1997 births
Living people
Italian female archers
Olympic archers of Italy
Archers at the 2020 Summer Olympics
People from Savona
Sportspeople from the Province of Savona
Competitors at the 2022 Mediterranean Games
Mediterranean Games silver medalists for Italy
Mediterranean Games medalists in archery
Competitors at the 2022 World Games
World Games gold medalists
World Games medalists in archery
21st-century Italian women